P. magnus  may refer to:
 Paragomphus magnus, a dragonfly species found in Kenya, Mozambique, Tanzania, and Zimbabwe
 Peptostreptococcus magnus, an anaerobic, Gram-positive, non-spore forming bacterium species
 Pontolis magnus, an extinct species of walrus.

See also
 Magnus